Asahinea is a genus of lichenized fungi in the family Parmeliaceae. The genus has a widespread circumpolar distribution, and contains three species. The genus was circumscribed by the husband and wife lichenologist team William and Chicita F. Culberson in 1965, with Asahinea chrysantha as the type species. The genus name honours Japanese lichenologist Yasuhiko Asahina.

See also
List of Parmeliaceae genera

References

Parmeliaceae
Lichen genera
Lecanorales genera
Taxa described in 1965